ACS Progresul Ezeriș is a Romanian football club based in Ezeriș, Caraș-Severin County, currently playing in Liga III.

References

External links
 Soccerway profile
 Global Sports Archive profile

Football clubs in Romania
Liga III clubs